Life and Death of an American Fourtracker was the third album by John Vanderslice, released in 2002.

Track listing
All songs by John Vanderslice unless otherwise noted
"Fiend in a Cloud" (Blake, Vanderslice)
"Me and My 424"
"Underneath the Leaves"
"Interlude No. 4"
"The Mansion"
"Nikki Oh Nikki" (Darnielle, Vanderslice)
"Amitriptyline"
"Greyhound"
"Interlude No. 5" (Barnett, Vanderslice)
"Cool Purple Mist" (Darnielle, Vanderslice)
"From Out Here"
"Fiend in a Cloud, Pt. 2"

2002 albums
John Vanderslice albums